Hønefoss Ballklubb is a Norwegian football club from Hønefoss, founded in 1895. The club was a part of the multi-sports club L/F Hønefoss, which folded in 2008.

After 11 years in 1. divisjon, the second tier of Norwegian football, Hønefoss was promoted to Tippeligaen in 2009, where they finished 14th in 2010 Tippeligaen and was relegated after a relegation-playoff against Fredrikstad. In 2011, Hønefoss won the 1. divisjon and was promoted to the Tippeligaen for the second time in three years. Their second spell in Tippeligaen lasted for two seasons, and they were again relegated to the 1. divisjon in 2013.

History
IF Liv multi-sports club was founded on 4 February 1895, and it merged with Fossekallen sports club in 1986 to create Liv/Fossekallen, which in 1997 changed name to L/F Hønefoss multi-sports club. The same year, the football branch of the sports club became economic and organisationally independent under its new name L/F Hønefoss Fotball. In 2002, the football club changed name to its current name Hønefoss Ballklub, and in 2009 the football club was completely separated from the defunct L/F Hønefoss sports club.

Hønefoss competed in the Tippeligaen in 2010, the top tier of Norwegian football after promotion at the end of the 2009 season. Hønefoss got a tough start in their first season in Tippeligaen and lost their first six matches, something that ended in head coach Ole Bjørn Sundgot being fired. Tom Guldbrandsen immediately took over the job as head coach, Hønefoss won their next match 1–0 away against Stabæk. The 2010 season ended in 14th place, which resulted in relegation playoff matches to stay in Tippeligaen. In the first match, Hønefoss won the semi-final against Ranheim, but lost the final later on against Fredrikstad, and therefore got relegated to the 1. divisjon.

In the 2011 season they won the 1. divisjon, one point ahead of Sandnes Ulf, and was again promoted to the Tippeligaen. Remond Mendy was the team's top scorer with 14 goals. The team's second season in the Tippeligaen started much better than in 2010, and after five games, they had two wins and three draws, and was fifth in the table. Hønefoss eventually finished the 2012 season in 13th place. In the 2013 season, the club collected 29 points and finished the season in 16th place and was relegated to the 1. divisjon along with Tromsø.

Recent seasons
{|class="wikitable"
|-bgcolor="#efefef"
! Season
! 
! Pos.
! Pl.
! W
! D
! L
! GS
! GA
! P
!Cup
!Notes
|-
|2001
|1. divisjon
|align=right |9
|align=right|30||align=right|10||align=right|10||align=right|10
|align=right|45||align=right|54||align=right|40
|Third round
|
|-
|2002
|1. divisjon
|align=right |4
|align=right|30||align=right|18||align=right|4||align=right|8
|align=right|64||align=right|36||align=right|58
|Second round
|
|-
|2003
|1. divisjon
|align=right |5
|align=right|30||align=right|16||align=right|7||align=right|7
|align=right|55||align=right|41||align=right|55
|Third round
|
|-
|2004
|1. divisjon
|align=right |12
|align=right|30||align=right|11||align=right|4||align=right|15
|align=right|52||align=right|54||align=right|37
|Third round
|
|-
|2005
|1. divisjon
|align=right |4
|align=right|30||align=right|17||align=right|5||align=right|8
|align=right|52||align=right|41||align=right|56
|Semifinal
|
|-
|2006
|1. divisjon
|align=right |4
|align=right|30||align=right|15||align=right|6||align=right|9
|align=right|64||align=right|47||align=right|51
|Third round
|
|-
|2007
|1. divisjon
|align=right |10
|align=right|30||align=right|8||align=right|11||align=right|11
|align=right|34||align=right|52||align=right|35
|Third round
|
|-
|2008
|1. divisjon
|align=right |5
|align=right|30||align=right|15||align=right|6||align=right|9
|align=right|47||align=right|33||align=right|51
|Second round
|
|-
|2009
|1. divisjon
|align=right bgcolor=#DDFFDD| 2
|align=right|30||align=right|16||align=right|8||align=right|6
|align=right|61||align=right|32||align=right|56
|Third round
|Promoted to Tippeligaen
|-
|2010
|Tippeligaen
|align=right bgcolor="#FFCCCC"| 14
|align=right|30||align=right|7||align=right|6||align=right|17
|align=right|28||align=right|62||align=right|27
|Fourth round
|Relegated to 1. divisjon
|-
|2011 
|1. divisjon
|align=right bgcolor=#DDFFDD| 1
|align=right|30||align=right|16||align=right|9||align=right|5
|align=right|61||align=right|28||align=right|57
||Fourth round
|Promoted to Tippeligaen
|-
|2012 
|Tippeligaen
|align=right |13
|align=right|30||align=right|7||align=right|12||align=right|11
|align=right|30||align=right|42||align=right|33
||Third round
|
|-
|2013
|Tippeligaen
|align=right bgcolor="#FFCCCC"| 16
|align=right|30||align=right|6||align=right|11||align=right|13
|align=right|34||align=right|47||align=right|29
||Third round
|Relegated to 1. divisjon
|-
|2014
|1. divisjon
|align=right |11
|align=right|30||align=right|12||align=right|4||align=right|14
|align=right|39||align=right|55||align=right|40
||Second round
|
|-
|2015
|1. divisjon
|align=right bgcolor="#FFCCCC"| 16
|align=right|30||align=right|7||align=right|7||align=right|16
|align=right|35||align=right|52||align=right|28
||Fourth round
|Relegated to 2. divisjon
|-
|2016 
|2. divisjon
|align=right |3
|align=right|26||align=right|12||align=right|6||align=right|8
|align=right|49||align=right|35||align=right|42
||Second round
|
|-
|2017
|2. divisjon
|align=right |10
|align=right|26||align=right|9||align=right|5||align=right|12
|align=right|35||align=right|41||align=right|32
||First round
|
|-
|2018
|2. divisjon
|align=right bgcolor="#FFCCCC"| 13
|align=right|26||align=right|5||align=right|5||align=right|16
|align=right|38||align=right|67||align=right|20
||Second round
|Relegated to 3. divisjon
|-
|2019
|3. divisjon
|align=right |4
|align=right|26||align=right|14||align=right|5||align=right|7
|align=right|67||align=right|40||align=right|47
||First round
|
|-
|2020
|colspan="11"|Season cancelled
|-
|2021
|3. divisjon
|align=right |4
|align=right|13||align=right|7||align=right|4||align=right|2
|align=right|28||align=right|18||align=right|25
||First round
|
|-
|2022
|3. divisjon
|align=right |7
|align=right|26||align=right|11||align=right|4||align=right|11
|align=right|56||align=right|46||align=right|37
||First round
|
|}

Source:

Current squad
''

Managers 

 Ole Asbjørn Underdal (1987)
 Per Ulseth (1987–88)
 Terje Liknes (1989–91)
 Kjell Ramberg (1992)
 Terje Liknes (1993)
 Paul Berg (1994–96)
 Roy Arild Fossum (1997–00)
 Per Brogeland (2001)
 Lars Tjærnås (2002–03)
 Peter Engelbrektsson (2004–06)
 Kjell Sverre Hansen Wold (2007)
 Ole Bjørn Sundgot (2008–10)
 Reidar Vågnes (2010)
 Leif Gunnar Smerud (2011–2013) 
 Roar Johansen (2013–2014)
 Rune Skarsfjord (2014–2015)
 René Skovdahl (2016)
 Frode Lafton (2016–)

References

External links

 Fosseberget – Supporter club

 
Football clubs in Norway
Eliteserien clubs
Sport in Buskerud
Association football clubs established in 1895
1895 establishments in Norway
Hønefoss